Fancy is the northernmost settlement in both the island of Saint Vincent and in the jurisdiction of Saint Vincent and the Grenadines. The town of Owia lies to the southeast of Fancy.

References
Scott, C. R. (ed.) (2005) Insight guide: Caribbean (5th edition). London: Apa Publications.

Populated places in Saint Vincent and the Grenadines